The Long Point Region Conservation Area is an agency of the province of Ontario, Canada, formed to preserve the volume of flow, and purity, of the watercourses that flow into Lake Erie, near Long Point.

Rivers that flow through the region include Big Otter Creek, Big Creek, Lynn River and Nanticoke Creek.

The region includes remnants of the Carolinian forest that once covered much of southern Ontario.

Conservation areas
Backus Heritage Conservation Area
Deer Creek Conservation Area
Haldimand Conservation Area
Norfolk Conservation Area
Waterford North Conservation Area

References

External links